The Security Belt Forces (Arabic: قوات الحزام الأمني) is a paramilitary force based in Southern Yemen and forms the elite military wing of the Southern Transitional Council. The force operates in the governorates of Aden, Lahij and Abyan and is trained and heavily supported by the United Arab Emirates Armed Forces.  The Security Belt has fought against Islah, al-Qaeda in the Arabian Peninsula and the Islamic State of Iraq and the Levant’s Yemeni branch. 

In the Battle of Aden (2018), Mount Hadid, which was run by Major General Aidarus al-Zoubaidi, and overlooked the 1st Brigade of the force, came under attack by the pro-Hadi government troops. The Security Belt consolidated its force in Aden and has established it as its central command.

According to reporting by The Associated Press, Security Belt is responsible for security at Beir Ahmed, a prison in Aden that has reportedly been the site of extensive torture and human rights violations.

See also
 Popular Resistance Committees (Yemen)
 Southern Movement
 South Yemen Insurgency

References

Paramilitary organizations based in Yemen
Yemeni Civil War (2014–present)
Organizations of the Yemeni Crisis (2011–present)
South Yemen
Separatism in Yemen